Pethia atra is a species of cyprinid fish native to India where it is found in sluggish streams in the Imphal Valley, Manipur.  This species can reach a length of  SL.

References 

Pethia
Fish described in 2007
Barbs (fish)